C15 or C.XV may refer to:
 Albatros C.XV, a 1918 German military reconnaissance aircraft
 BSA C15, a unit-construction motorcycle manufactured by the Birmingham Small Arms Company between 1959 and 1967
 Coronado C15, a sailboat
 , a 1908 British C-class submarine
 Sauber C15, a 1996 racing car
 Citroën C15, a light van
 IEC 60320 C15, a power connector
 The 15th century (1401–1500)
 McDonnell Douglas YC-15
 Esophageal cancer ICD-10 code
 Carbon-15 (C-15 or 15C), an isotope of carbon
 Caldwell 15 (NGC 6826), a planetary nebula in the constellation Cygnus
 A 15-minute Cassette tape, often used to store computer games
 A synthetic chemerin-derived peptide